A.C. Doukas School (Greek: Αθλητικός Σύλλογος Εκπαιδευτηρίων Δούκα/Α.Σ.Ε.Δ.) is a Greek multisport club based in Marousi, Athens. It was founded in 1979 by Doukas School and its colour is blue and white. The home of the club is the Dais gymnasium in Marousi. The club has teams in Handball, Basketball, Track and Field, futsal, Badminton and Gymnastics.

Basketball team

The basketball team was founded in the early 1990s. Nowadays, men's team plays in Beta Ethniki (third-tier level). The most successful era of the club history was the period 2003–2007, when the club played in A2 category (second-tier level).

Handball team
The handball team is the most successful team of the club having won many championships and cups of both men's and women's. Men's team has won 3 championship and 4 cup and women's team has won 1 championship and 1 cup. Men's Doukas team plays in A1 Ethniki (first division). In current season it finished in seventh place and the previous year it had finished in third place.

Men's team recent seasons

Honours
Men's team
Greek Championship
Winner (3): 1998, 2001, 2008
Greek Cup
Winner (4): 1998, 1999, 2008, 2010

Women's team
Greek Championship
Winner (1): 1994
Greek Cup
Winner (1): 1994

European record 
Men's team

Doukas Futsal team
Doukas Futsal team was founded in 1996. It plays almost constantly in the first division championship and has won 3 championship and 4 cups.

Honours
Greek Championship (4): 2001, 2017, 2018, 2021
Greek Futsal Cup (4): 2001, 2003, 2004, 2015

Athletics team
Doukas has a section of athletics. Many notable Greek athletes have transferred in Doukas. Cases in point are Niki Bakogianni, Angeliki Tsiolakoudi and Stella Tsikouna.

References

External links
Official website
Basketball team

Multi-sport clubs in Athens
Sports clubs in Athens
Greek handball clubs
Futsal clubs in Greece
Futsal clubs established in 1996